Buffalo is a town in Putnam County, West Virginia, located along the Kanawha River. The population was 1,211 at the time of the 2020 census. Buffalo is a part of the Huntington–Ashland metropolitan area.

History
Along with numerous sites in the Kanawha River Valley, Buffalo was originally settled by waves of ancient cultures of prehistoric indigenous peoples. Clovis points indicate the presence of inhabitants more than 10,000 years ago. One of the last cultures, that of the Fort Ancient people, had a few villages such as Buffalo and Marmet that survived into the time of European exploration.

Historic tribes such as the Huron, from the Great Lakes region, and the Conoy (also spelled Conois and Kanawha) were driven out of the central valley by Iroquois' invading from their base in present-day Western New York. Many of the Conoy by the early-17th century had resettled on the west side of the Chesapeake Bay and below the Potomac River. After decades of encroachment by English colonists, surviving Conoy (also called Piscataway by then) went north to Pennsylvania and allied with the Susquehannock and Iroquois.

The town was named after the American buffalo which once roamed here.

Geography
Buffalo is located at  (38.616994, -81.979938).

Demographics

2010 census
As of the census of 2010, there were 1,236 people, 518 households, and 344 families living in the town. The racial makeup of the town was 97.4% White, 0.5% African American, 0.2% Native American, 0.4% Asian, 0.4% from other races, and 1.1% from two or more races. Hispanic or Latino of any race were 0.7% of the population.

There were 518 households, of which 28.4% had children under the age of 18 living with them, 51.2% were married couples living together, 9.8% had a female householder with no husband present, 5.4% had a male householder with no wife present, and 33.6% were non-families. 28.2% of all households were made up of individuals, and 12.8% had someone living alone who was 65 years of age or older. The average household size was 2.36 and the average family size was 2.89.

The median age in the town was 42.8 years. 21% of residents were under the age of 18; 8.1% were between the ages of 18 and 24; 24.5% were from 25 to 44; 28.7% were from 45 to 64; and 17.7% were 65 years of age or older. The gender makeup of the town was 49.8% male and 50.2% female.

Manufacturing
Toyota Manufacturing plant, covering over one million square feet, is located in Buffalo. Transmissions and four- and six-cylinder engines are manufactured.

Notable people 
 Virginia Mae Brown, civil servant and lawyer
 Kathie Hess Crouse, member of the West Virginia House of Delegates
 William Hope Harvey, lawyer, author, politician, and businessman

References

Towns in Putnam County, West Virginia
Populated places on the Kanawha River
Towns in West Virginia